Hanga Roa (Rapa Nui pronunciation: [ˈha.ŋa ˈɾo.a]) (Spanish: Bahía Larga) is the main town, harbour and seat of Easter Island, a municipality of Chile. It is located in the southern part of the island's west coast, in the lowlands between the extinct volcanoes of Terevaka and Rano Kau.

History
Hanga Roa in the native Rapa Nui language means "wide bay" or "long bay".

Upon Chile's claim of the island, the Rapa Nui were forced in Hanga Roa, and the rest of the land was leased to a sheep farm. For much of the twentieth century, the rest of the island was leased to the Compañía Explotadora de la Isla de Pascua (CEDIP) (a subsidiary of Williamson-Balfour Company) and closed to the Rapa Nui.

Some disagreements between the government of Chile and the Rapa Nui has led the locals with ancestral roots to "take over" many hotels in the city. For the locals, it is a way to draw the line between the Chilean government's policy-making in the island, and the Rapa Nui's ancestral rights on their land. In 2011, the Schiess family, owner of the Hanga Roa Hotel, donated back the land of the hotel to the Rapa Nui, but retained a 30-year management lease of the hotel. A week before, the Schiess family had personally shipped a special force squad from the Carabineros de Chile to remove the locals who squatted the hotel. A prior police intervention in August 2010 had led to 25 Rapa Nui protesters being wounded.

Geography
The island's main avenue, Avenida Atamu Tekena (formerly Avenida Policarpo Toro), is the heart of the town. Many hotels, restaurants, grocery stores and pharmacies are found alongside this road. In 1998, the road was renamed after nineteenth century Rapanui king Atamu Te Kena; it had previously been named after Captain Policarpo Toro, the Chilean Naval officer who annexed Easter Island to Chile in 1888. The island's museum, and also the Roman Catholic "Holy Cross Church", are located in the center of town. With the advent of the Internet and the expansion of communication services by the Chilean government, many internet cafes and automated teller machines (ATM) have appeared in recent years.

Population
In 1914, the population of Hanga Roa was just 250 and the rest of the island was inhabited by large populations of sheep.

It is estimated that 90% of the island's population live in Hanga Roa.

Economy

Tourism
The town has a number of hotels and guesthouses which cater for tourists who come to see the island's World Heritage Sites, in particular the famous moai statues. Hanga Roa and the surrounding area have a number of impressive moai, but there are larger ones elsewhere on the island. Total capacity is about 2,500 beds as of 2022, ranging from camping sites to luxury hotels, including hotel Hanga Roa. 

The Ahu Tahai archaeological complex is within a walking distance from the city's center. Every year, the city is home to the farandula cultural festival, a months-long event when the locals sculpt giant wooden statues. The celebration includes a habit where people get nude and bath in clay that covers their bodies.

Other activities
In addition to tourism, other businesses in Hanga Roa include fishing, farming and administration. Several Chilean government departments including the Chilean Navy maintain a presence on the island.

The harbour has a shipping service to Valparaíso, Chile. In April 2018, the freighter Lago Icalma, parked in the port of Hanga Roa, was struck by a barge. A fuel tank was ruptured, leaking diesel fuel in the waters of the port. The surrounding beaches were also blackened by the spread of the black liquid.

Infrastructure

Transportation
The island's only airport, Mataveri International Airport, is served by LATAM Airlines, Chile's national carrier, which offers direct 5-hour flights from Santiago and weekly flights from Papeete. It is the only commercial carrier that regularly serves the island.

Health
A new hospital was opened in 2013, replacing an older one donated in the 70s by the United States. The hospital has a capacity of 16 beds, and includes a delivery ward designed to also allow the practice of folk medicine. It is the only healthcare facility on the island.

Education
Among several schools are the Colegio Lorenzo Baeza Vega, which offers primary education with a focus on teaching traditional culture and language, and Liceo Aldea Educativa, which offers qualification in the areas of humanist studies, tourism and agriculture.

Sport
Hanga Roa has a multi-use stadium, the Estadio de Hanga Roa, which is the home ground of the CF Rapa Nui, the football team representing Easter Island.

Access to food
The regular consumer brands sold in grocery stores are expensive due to the costly and time-consuming trip required to import those products. Locals informally sell fish, meat and vegetables. The tuna empanada is the city's favorite snack.

Gallery

See also

 List of towns in Chile

References

External links

 
 Hanga Roa map on isladepascua.travel

 
Capitals of Chilean provinces
Communes of Chile
Geography of Easter Island
Port settlements in Chile
Populated places in Isla de Pascua Province
Populated places in Oceania
1888 establishments in Easter Island